Feng County or Fengxian is a county under the administration of Baoji City, in the west of Shaanxi province, China, bordering Gansu province to the west. There are museums, including a new one about Gung Ho

Administrative divisions
As 2020, this County is divided to 9 towns.
Towns

Climate

References

External links
Official website of Feng County government

County-level divisions of Shaanxi
Baoji